Major General Edmund Bower Sebree (January 7, 1898 – June 25, 1966) was a senior United States Army officer who commanded U.S. Army forces during World War II and Korean War.

Early life

Sebree was born on January 7, 1898, in the city of Olney, Illinois, as a son of Milton Eddy and Catella (Bower) Sebree. He attended a Cornell University in New York and after one year, Sebree was transferred to the United States Military Academy at West Point. He was commissioned as infantry second lieutenant on November 1, 1918.

His first assignment was with American Expeditionary Forces during occupation duties in Weimar Germany in 1919. After return from the Europe, Sebree attended a training course at United States Army Infantry School at Fort Benning and then, in 1920, Sebree was assigned to the 3rd Infantry Regiment at Chilkoot Barracks, Alaska, where he spent next three years.

Following a service between the years 1923–1928 with 21st Infantry Regiment at Vancouver Barracks, Washington and with 31st Infantry Regiment at Manila, Philippine Islands, Sebree was appointed a professor of military science and tactics at Western Military Academy in Alton, Illinois.

After four years at Western Military Academy, Sebree was transferred back to the Philippine Islands, where he was assigned to the 45th Infantry Regiment. In 1936, newly promoted Captain Sebree was ordered back to States, where he attended a special officers course at Command and General Staff School at Fort Leavenworth, Kansas. After completion of course, Captain Sebree was appointed an Aide to Major general Herbert J. Brees, commander of VIII Corps at Fort Sam Houston, Texas.

Sebree spent over three years in that capacity and in 1940, he was transferred to the staff of the 9th Infantry Division under command of Major General Jacob L. Devers. But Sebree spent there only few months and was subsequently transferred to the personnel division of the War Department General Staff.

World War II
During the strategically significant Guadalcanal Campaign in 1942, Sebree was assigned to the Americal Division under command of Major General Alexander Patch, as its assistant division commander. Sebree assumed command of entire Americal Division at the beginning of the January, 1943, when Major General Patch was appointed a commander of the XIV Corps.

Briefly commanded the Americal Division units engaged with Japanese forces for control of the island. Following the Guadalcanal Campaign, General Sebree was returned to the U.S. to train and deploy with Major General Paul W. Baade's 35th Infantry Division, serving as its Assistant Division Commander (ADC). During the Lorraine Campaign, Sebree led an independent task force of infantry and armored units with artillery and supporting arms in the liberation of Nancy.  After the war, he served as the first Defense Attache to Australia. He was also the commander of TRUST (TRieste United States Troops) in the Free Territory of Trieste.

Later life and death
Edmund Sebree died in Fort Ord, California on June 25, 1966, and was buried at San Francisco National Cemetery.

Decorations
Ribbon bar with the list of Sebree's decorations:

References

Sources

Books

Web

External links
Generals of World War II
United States Army Officers 1939−1945

|-

|-

1898 births
1966 deaths
United States Army Infantry Branch personnel
People from Olney, Illinois
United States Army generals
Recipients of the Legion of Merit
Recipients of the Distinguished Service Medal (US Army)
Recipients of the Silver Star
Recipients of the Legion of Honour
Recipients of the Croix de guerre (Belgium)
United States Army personnel of World War I
United States Army personnel of the Korean War
United States Army generals of World War II
United States Army Command and General Staff College alumni
United States Military Academy alumni
Military personnel from Illinois
Burials at San Francisco National Cemetery